Burbur may refer to:
 Tuone Udaina (d. 1898), last speaker of Dalmatian, nicknamed Burbur
 Burbur, Hamadan, a village in Hamadan Province, Iran
 Burbur, Kermanshah, a village in Kermanshah Province, Iran
 Burbur, Eslamabad-e Gharb, a village in Kermanshah Province, Iran
 Burbur, North Khorasan, a village in North Khorasan Province, Iran
 Burbur Tappeh, a village in Golestan Province, Iran
 Burbur, West Azerbaijan, a village in West Azerbaijan Province, Iran
 Burbur-e Olya, a village in Lorestan Province, Iran
 Burbur-e Sofla, a village in Lorestan Province, Iran
 Burbur-e Vosta, a village in Lorestan Province, Iran

See also
 Burbure, a commune in the Hauts-de-France region, France